Iness Chepkesis Chenonge (born 1 February 1982 in Trans-Nzoia District) is a Kenyan runner who specializes in the 5000 metres. She was the bronze medallist at the 2002 Commonwealth Games and repeated the feat eight years later at the 2010 Commonwealth Games, forming a Kenyan sweep of the medals with Vivian Cheruiyot and Sylvia Kibet.

Chenonge was the 2008 winner of the Marseille-Cassis Classique Internationale road race. She set a personal best of 1:09:08 for the half marathon in March 2011, taking fifth place at the Lisbon Half Marathon.

Major championship record

Personal bests
1500 metres - 4:08.61 (2009) 	 
3000 metres - 8:39.29 min (2006)
5000 metres - 14:39.19 min (2010)
Half marathon - 1:09:08 hrs (2011)

References

External links

 Iness Chenonge at demadonna.com

1982 births
Living people
People from Trans-Nzoia County
Kenyan female long-distance runners
Commonwealth Games bronze medallists for Kenya
Athletes (track and field) at the 2002 Commonwealth Games
Athletes (track and field) at the 2006 Commonwealth Games
Athletes (track and field) at the 2010 Commonwealth Games
Commonwealth Games medallists in athletics
Kenyan female cross country runners
Medallists at the 2002 Commonwealth Games